Grand Canyon: The Hidden Secrets is a 34-minute short IMAX documentary film that was theatrically released on June 16, 1984. The film was created, directed, and written by American filmmaker Kieth Merrill and was produced by Destination Cinema. The music is composed by Bill Conti.

The IMAX film was followed by The Making of Grand Canyon: The Hidden Secrets, a 24-minute making-of documentary short released on January 11, 1999, but produced by Destination Cinema in 1993.

Synopsis
The film covers the human history of the Grand Canyon area, being from a home to indigenous tribes to a major tourist destination. It portrays reenactments of the "Anasazi" people, European explorers, and the first expedition led by Major John Wesley Powell.

Much of the film was shot from a helicopter flying throughout the Canyon. The ending features a flight sequence following a lone, orange ultralight aircraft.

Production
In addition to the Grand Canyon, parts of the film were shot in Kanab, Utah.

Venue near the Grand Canyon

, the film has been playing at the IMAX theater adjacent to the National Geographic visitor center in Tusayan, Arizona, which is located near the South Rim of the Grand Canyon, in Grand Canyon National Park. There, the film is promotionally titled the Grand Canyon Movie.

See also
 History of the Grand Canyon area
 Grand Canyon
 Grand Canyon National Park
 Grand Canyon Village
 Grand Canyon Village Historic District

References

External links
 National Geographic Visitor Center – Grand Canyon
 
 

Films directed by Kieth Merrill
IMAX short films
1984 films
1980s short documentary films
American short documentary films
1984 3D films
Documentary films about United States history
Works about the Grand Canyon
3D short films
IMAX documentary films
Films shot in Arizona
Films shot in Utah
3D documentary films
Films scored by Bill Conti
Documentary films about Arizona
Documentary films about Utah
1980s English-language films
1980s American films